The Musical Instruments Museum (MIM) is a music museum in central Brussels, Belgium. It is part of the Royal Museums of Art and History (RMAH) and is internationally renowned for its collection of over 8,000 instruments.

Since 2000, the museum has been located in the former Old England department store, built in 1899 by Paul Saintenoy out of girded steel and glass in Art Nouveau style, as well as the adjoining 18th-century neoclassical building designed by Barnabé Guimard. Located at 2, / on the Mont des Arts/Kunstberg, the museum stands next to the Place Royale/Koningsplein and in front of the Magritte Museum. It is served by Brussels Central Station and Parc/Park metro station on lines 1 and 5 of the Brussels Metro.

History

Early history
The MIM collection was created in 1877 and was originally attached to the Royal Conservatory of Brussels with the purpose of demonstrating early instruments to students. It consisted of a hundred Indian instruments given to King Leopold II by Rajah Sourindro Mohun Tagore in 1876, as well as the collection of the celebrated Belgian musicologist François-Joseph Fétis, purchased by the Belgian Government in 1872, and put on deposit in the Conservatory, where Fétis was the first director. Its first curator, Victor-Charles Mahillon, greatly expanded the already impressive collection, and by the time of his death in 1924, the MIM consisted of some 3,666 articles, among which 3,177 were original musical instruments. He was noted for his astute judgments in obtaining these large collections by calling on philanthropists, mixing with erudite amateurs who sometimes became generous donors, and through friendly relations with Belgian diplomats in foreign posts, who sometimes brought back instruments from beyond Europe.

The monumental five-volume catalogue of the collection Mahillon commissioned, between 1880 and 1922, also included four versions of his essay on the methodical classification of both ancient and modern instruments, which was to serve as the basis for the organological Hornbostel-Sachs classification systems, still used today. Beginning in 1877, Mahillon also created a restoration workshop in the MIM, where he employed and trained a worker, Franz de Vestibule, to restore damaged articles and make copies of unique instruments in other public collections. Mahillon's successor at the Conservatory, François-Auguste Gevaert, organised several successful concerts of professors and students playing early instruments, in the 1880s.

20th and 21st centuries
After the First World War, as donors and philanthropists as well as Belgium's famed instrument makers started becoming scarcer, only about a thousand instruments were added to the collections between 1924 and 1968. Until 1957, the curators at the head of the MIM—Ernest Closson (1924–1936), his son Herman (1936–1945), and René Lyr (1945–1957)—limited themselves to preserving the already collected instruments, in not always satisfactory conditions. Ernest is notable for editing several articles on Belgian makers for the National Biography and devoting a long monograph to La facture des instruments de musique en Belgique, which appeared at the 1935 International Exposition held in Brussels.

With the arrival of the esteemed Latinist Roger Bragard, curator between 1957 and 1968, larger budgets became available from the Ministry of Culture, as exhibits were renovated, new personnel were hired, concerts were again organised, and new rare pieces were collected. Between 1968 and 1989, René de Mayer continued the momentum initiated by Bragard, assisted by a team of specialised scientists. It was at the beginning of the 1990s that the revival of the MIM really began, when Nicolas Meeùs took over its management (from 1989 to 1995) on an interim basis. He started to design the layout of the museum in the former Old England department store, bought since 1978 by the Belgian State. The restoration of the building lasted until 1994, when it won the Quartier des Arts prize for the quality of the renovation of the facades. The MIM moved under the direction of Malou Haine (from 1994 to 2009). In 1998, the MIM became the official occupant of the building and it was after two years of development that the museum, renovated and resolutely modern, opened its doors to the general public. Haine remains honorary curator of the museum.

Exhibits
The museum's collection presents Belgian musical history (including Brussels' importance in the making of recorders and various obscure proto-synthesizers (Ondes Martenot, Theremin, etc.) in the 18th and 19th centuries and as the home of the instrument inventor Adolphe Sax in the 19th century), European musical traditions, and non-European instruments. Visitors are given infrared headphones in order to listen to almost 300 musical extracts of the instruments on display. Information is provided in French,  Dutch and English.

With over 7,000 pieces from all around the world, this museum houses one of the largest collections of musical instruments on the planet. Mechanical instruments are shown in the basement, traditional instruments on the ground floor, the development of the modern orchestral instruments on the first floor, and keyboard and stringed instruments on the second floor. Among the notable pieces of the collection are the famous Rottenburgh Alto recorder, instruments invented by Adolphe Sax, a unique set of giant Chinese stone chimes, and the only existing copy of the luthéal, an instrument used by Ravel.

Besides exhibiting the permanent collection, the museum occasionally also programs temporary exhibitions and concerts of influential contemporary inventors such as the Baschet Brothers, Pierre Bastien, Yuri Landman, Logos Foundation and others.

See also
 List of music museums
 Art Nouveau in Brussels
 Culture of Belgium
 Belgium in "the long nineteenth century"

References

Notes

Bibliography

External links

 Official museum website
 Entry on Musical Instrument Museum from the BBC h2g2
 Musical Instrument Museum information from Tripadvisor
 Photos of the Musical Instrument Museum from Have Camera Will Travel

Museums in Brussels
Museums established in 1877
Commercial buildings completed in 1899
Musical instrument museums
1877 establishments in Belgium
Art Nouveau architecture in Brussels
Art Nouveau museum buildings
Art Nouveau retail buildings
City of Brussels
Music organisations based in Belgium
Royal Conservatory of Brussels
Music museums in Belgium

da:Old England